Richard Laurence Broome,  (born 1 October 1948) is an Australian historian, academic, and emeritus professor of history at La Trobe University, Melbourne. He is known as an authority on Aboriginal history in Australia.

In 2007 Broome's book Aboriginal Victorians: A History Since 1800 won the Victorian Community History Awards for Best Print / Publication.

Broome was made a Member of the Order of Australia in the 2020 Australia Day Honours for "significant service to education in the field of history, and to historical groups".

Bibliography

Author

Editor

References

External links
Broome's profile at La Trobe University (archived 10 April 2018)
Podcast and transcript of interview with Richard Broome on Aboriginal history

1948 births
Australian historians
Fellows of the Australian Academy of the Humanities
Academic staff of La Trobe University
Living people
Members of the Order of Australia
University of New South Wales alumni
University of Sydney alumni